Taguig–Pateros's 2nd congressional district  (also known simply as Taguig's 2nd congressional district and Taguig's lone congressional district) is one of the two congressional districts of the Philippines in the combined independent local government units of Pateros and Taguig. The district is located entirely within the city of Taguig. It has been represented in the House of Representatives of the Philippines since 2007. The district was created in 2004 following a plebiscite to ratify Republic Act No. 8487 or the 1998 Taguig City Charter. It consists of the western Taguig barangays of Central Bicutan, Central Signal Village, Fort Bonifacio, Katuparan, Maharlika Village, North Daang Hari, North Signal Village, Pinagsama, South Daang Hari, South Signal Village, Tanyag, Upper Bicutan and Western Bicutan. The district is currently represented in the 19th Congress by Amparo Maria J. Zamora of the Nacionalista Party (NP).

Representation history

Election results

2022

2019

2016

2013

2010

See also
Legislative district of Taguig

References

Congressional districts of the Philippines
Politics of Taguig
2004 establishments in the Philippines
Congressional districts of Metro Manila
Constituencies established in 2004